Abhay Singh Deol (born 15 March 1976) is an Indian actor and producer who is known for his work in Hindi films alongside Kannada and Tamil cinema. Born in the Deol family, he made his on-screen debut in 2005 with Imtiaz Ali's romantic comedy Socha Na Tha.

After the modest success of his debut, Deol was praised for his performances in films such as Manorama Six Feet Under (2007) and Oye Lucky! Lucky Oye! (2008). His breakthrough role came in 2009 with the starring role as Dev in Anurag Kashyap's black comedy Dev.D, a modern-day adaptation of Devdas. Following the success of the film, Deol gained wider recognition.

After mainly appearing in independent films early in his career, he starred in Zoya Akhtar's Zindagi Na Milegi Dobara, a road trip film that went to become one of the highest-grossing films in Bollywood. His performance was well-received and earned him his first nomination for Filmfare Award for Best Supporting Actor. Deol has since appeared in independent films including the drama Road, Movie (2010) and the war film Chakravyuh (2012), while simultaneously working in commercially successful films including the romantic drama Raanjhanaa (2013), and the romantic comedy Happy Bhag Jayegi (2016). He made his debut in Tamil language film Hero.

Deol is noted for his portrayal of complex characters on screen, and is vociferous in his support for parallel cinema in India. Deol owns a  production company, Forbidden Films which he established in 2009. In addition to his acting career, he is also an active philanthropist and supports various NGOs.

Early life
Deol was born into a Sikh Jatt family to Ajit Singh Deol and Usha Deol. He is the nephew of actor Dharmendra, and the cousin of Sunny Deol, Bobby Deol, Esha Deol and Ahana Deol. Abhay Deol stated in an interview with Rediff that he is into acting not because of his father, but because he was involved in theatre since school. "At 18, I decided to take the plunge. It took me 10 years because I didn't want to leave my education to get into films."

Acting career

Debut and early success (2005–07)
Deol made his film debut in the 2005 Imtiaz Ali's Socha Na Tha, a romantic comedy where he starred opposite Ayesha Takia. The film garnered mostly positive reviews from critics and was an average grosser at the box-office. Deol's performance in the film was well received. His second film role was 2006's romantic drama Ahista Ahista opposite Soha Ali Khan. Deol's first 2007 release was the ensemble comedy drama Honeymoon Travels Pvt. Ltd. which emerged as a box-office success. Deol had two more releases in the year, the crime film Ek Chalis Ki Last Local and the thriller Manorama Six Feet Under. The latter won the Best Film at the Mahindra Indo-American Arts Council Film Festival in New York City, and Deol won the Best Actor Award.

Breakthrough and rise to prominence (2008–11)
Deol's sole release of 2008 was dark comedy film Oye Lucky! Lucky Oye!. Directed by Dibakar Banerjee, the film had Deol portray a compulsive thief, Lovinder Singh a.k.a. Lucky, and the film's plot follows his exploits.  Oye Lucky! Lucky Oye! was met with critical acclaim, but suffered heavily because of the timing of its release, a day after the 2008 Mumbai attacks, leading to widespread fear of crowded places.

Deol's breakthrough role came in 2009 when he portrayed the titular character in Anurag Kashyap's 2009 neo-noir film Dev.D, a modern-day adaptation of Sarat Chandra Chattopadhyay's classic Bengali romance novel Devdas. The idea behind the film was conceived by Kashyap during a conversation with Deol where the latter spoke about a man frequenting a Los Angeles strip club like a "modern day Devdas". Dev.D. received widespread attention for its distinct visual style, experimental soundtrack, and innovative narrative structure which was unprecedented for any Bollywood film. In a 4 out of 5 star review for The Times of India, Nikhat Kazmi deemed Deol's performance in the film as a "class act". Deol appeared alongside Tannishtha Chatterjee in Road, Movie. Deol made a cameo appearance for an Item number in the movie Tera Kya Hoga Johnny in 2010. In 2009, Deol launched a production company Forbidden Films, with Junction being the film to be picked up by the banner.

In 2010, he portrayed Arjun Burman, an investment banker opposite Sonam Kapoor's eponymous lead in the ensemble romantic comedy Aisha, which also starred Ira Dubey, Cyrus Sahukar, Amrita Puri, Anand Tiwari, Arunoday Singh and Lisa Haydon. In 2011, Deol starred in Zoya Akhtar's ensemble comedy-drama road film Zindagi Na Milegi Dobara alongside Hrithik Roshan, Farhan Akhtar, Katrina Kaif and Kalki Koechlin. The story follows 3 friends, who have been inseparable since childhood, had him play the role of Kabir, an architect. They set off to Spain on a bachelor trip for Kabir who is set to be married to Natasha, an interior designer played by Koechlin. He trained to be a deep-sea diver for the film which was filmed in Spain. The film opened to high critical acclaim and grossed  worldwide, surpassing Dhoom 2 in the worldwide gross, becoming the ninth-highest worldwide-grosser of all time for a Bollywood film, at the time of its release. Zindagi Na Milegi Dobara won Best Film among other awards, and Deol received a nomination for Best Supporting Actor for his performance in the film.

New career moves and fluctuations (2012–present)
Deol had two releases in 2012, both of which were political thrillers– Dibakar Banerjee's Shanghai and Prakash Jha's Chakravyuh. In the latter, Deol starred alongside Arjun Rampal as a police informer, but later gets involved in a Naxalite movement. The film received mixed reviews from film critics. Shanghai co-starring Emraan Hashmi and Kalki Koechlin was based on the French novel Z by Vassilis Vassilikos. The film opened to positive reviews and Deol's performance as a bureaucrat/IAS officer garnered much acclaim. Raja Sen of Rediff.com applauded Deol writing, "he wears his inscrutability thickly and delivers a strong performance". In 2014, Deol hosted few episodes of Channel V's crime television series Gumrah: End of Innocence.

In 2021  Deol was seen in series 1962: The War in the Hills as Major Suraj Singh, a character inspired from Major Shaitan Singh, Disney Channel original film Spin, hailed as Disney's first film centered around an Indian-American family, wherein he played the role of Arvind Kumar, the father of the protagonist Rhea Kumar, a teenage girl who learns that she has a passion for creating DJ mixes and crime comedy film Velle.

In the media
Deol has been described by the Indian media as an actor who continuously understands how to play complex characters. He appeared on several magazine covers including the Man's World and the Time Out Mumbai, with titles such as "The New Face of Indian Cinema". In 2009, Deol was included in the list of Zoom's "50 Most Desirable Hotties", being placed seventh. Deol learned the Israeli martial art Krav Maga. He has expressed feminist views on social media and has also been vocal about minority and migrant rights in India.

Filmography

Films

Television

Web series

Awards and nominations

References

External links

 
 

1976 births
Living people
Indian male film actors
Indian feminists
Male feminists
Sikh feminists
Punjabi people
Indian Sikhs
Male actors in Hindi cinema
21st-century Indian male actors
Indian male playback singers
Male actors from Mumbai